Fuheng (1720 – July 1770), courtesy name Chunhe (春和), was a Qing dynasty official from the Manchu Fuca clan and the Bordered Yellow Banner of the Eight Banners, and was a younger brother of the Empress Xiaoxianchun. He served as a senior minister at the court of his brother-in-law, the Qianlong Emperor from the 1750s to his death in 1770. He is best known for leading the Qing troops in the fourth and last invasion of Burma in the Sino-Burmese War (1765–1769).

Prior to his appointment as the commander-in-chief of the Burma campaign, Fuheng was chief grand  councilor to the emperor, and one of the emperor's most trusted advisers. Fuheng was one of the few senior officials that fully backed the Qianlong Emperor's decision to eliminate the Dzungars in the 1750s when most at the court thought war was too risky. His nephew Mingrui was a son-in-law of the emperor, and led the Burma campaign of 1767–1768. His son Fuk'anggan was a senior general in the Qing military.

Fuheng was unsuccessful in the Burma campaign. In December 1769, he signed a truce with the Burmese, which the emperor did not accept. He died of malaria, which he contracted during his three-month invasion of Burma, when he got back to Beijing.

Family
Princess Consort, of the Yehe-Nara clan (福晋那拉氏):
Fuk'anggan, Prince Jiayong of the Second Rank (福康安 嘉勇郡王; 1753 – 1796), third  son
Concubine, of the Li clan (李氏):
Fu Chang'an, Marquess of Chengjing (誠靖侯 福長安; 1760 – 1810), adopted son
Concubine, of the Sugiya clan (孙佳氏)
Unknown:
Fulong'an, Duke Zhongyong (一等忠勇公 福隆安; 1746 – 1784), second son 
Fuling'an, Knight Commandant of the Cloud (雲騎尉 福靈安; d.1767), first son
Lady Fuca (富察氏; d.1813) 
married Prince Yongxing, Qianlong Emperor's 11th son with Consort Jia, and had issue ( two sons and two daughters)
Lady Fuca (富察氏)
 married Chunying, Prince Rui , and had issue (two sons)

In fiction and popular culture 

 Portrayed by Joseph Lee in Take Care, Your Highness! (1985)
Portrayed by Hung Tak-sing in The Rise and Fall of Qing Dynasty (1988)
Portrayed by Zhang Wei in My Fair Princess (1998)
Portrayed by Yang Junyi in Li Wei Resigns from Office (2005)
Portrayed by Xing Hanqing in New My Fair Princess (2011)
Portrayed by Xu Kai in Story of Yanxi Palace (2018)
Portrayed by Jia Tinglong in Ruyi's Royal Love in the Palace (2018)

See also 

 Ten Great Campaigns
 Sino-Burmese War (1765–1769)

References

1720 births
1770 deaths
Qing dynasty generals
Qing dynasty politicians
Manchu politicians
Viceroys of Shaan-Gan
Viceroys of Sichuan
Grand Councillors of the Qing dynasty
Grand Secretaries of the Qing dynasty
Assistant Grand Secretaries
Manchu Bordered Yellow Bannermen